Hieromonk Pahomije (1496–1544) was a Serbian Orthodox hieromonk and one of the first printers of books in the Serbian language. He learned his printing skills from Hieromonk Makarije at the Crnojević printing house in the period of 1494–96. In 1518 he accepted the invitation of Božidar Vuković and went to Venice where he organized printing at the Vuković printing house in the period of 1519/1520–21.

Zeta 
The first printing house Pahomije worked at was the Crnojević printing house in Obod, Rijeka Crnojevića, in the period of 1494–96. There he learned printing skills from hieromonk Makarije and practicised it until Đurađ Crnojević fled Zeta and went to Venice in 1496. Pahomije was one of eight printers who worked at the Crnojević printing house.

Venice 
In 1518 Božidar Vuković invited Pahomije to come to Venice and organize the printing at the printing press of Vuković. Pahomije accepted this invitation and went to Venice. Pahomije was head of the organization of work at the printing house, and also worked as an editor and corrector there. The printing house was operational in two periods, 1519/1520–21 and 1536–40. During the first period Pahomije printed three books, a book of hours (Časlovac, or Psaltir) in 1519, Liturgijar and Molitvenik.

In March 1520 he wrote on the cover of one of the books he printed that he was "from the islands of the Diocletian Lake" . In a 1544 document he wrote reka instead of rijeka (Rijeka Crnojevića), concluding that he hailed from an Ekavian accent region (somewhere in modern Serbia), however, in some later works this assumption was rejected.

See also
Božidar Vuković
Božidar Goraždanin
Đurađ Crnojević
Stefan Marinović
Hieromonk Mardarije
Hegumen Mardarije
Vićenco Vuković
Trojan Gundulić
Andrija Paltašić
Jakov of Kamena Reka
Bartolomeo Ginammi who followed Zagurović's footsteps reprinting Serbian books.
Dimitrije Ljubavić
Stefan Paštrović
Inok Sava
Mojsije Dečanac

References

Sources

Further reading
 
 Б. Сп. Радојичић, Пахомије „от Црније Гори от Реке", Историски записи, књ. X, Цетиње, год. VII, 1954, св. 1, 225—227

16th-century Serbian people
16th-century printers
16th-century Eastern Orthodox clergy
Serbian printers
Serbian monks
Serb priests
Serbian Orthodox clergy
16th-century Christian monks
16th-century businesspeople from the Ottoman Empire